The 2016 World Junior Figure Skating Championships were held from 14–20 March 2016 in Debrecen, Hungary. Commonly called "World Juniors" and "Junior Worlds", the event determined the World Junior champions in the disciplines of men's singles, ladies' singles, pair skating, and ice dancing.

Anna Dušková / Martin Bidař and Daniel Samohin became the first World Junior champions in figure skating from the Czech Republic and Israel, respectively. Japan's Marin Honda won the ladies' title and Lorraine McNamara / Quinn Carpenter took the ice dancing event.

Records

The following new junior records were set during this competition:

Qualification
The competition was open to skaters from ISU member nations who were at least 13 but not 19—or 21 for male pair skaters and ice dancers—before July 1, 2015 in their place of birth. National associations selected their entries according to their own criteria but the ISU mandated that their selections achieve a minimum technical elements score (TES) at an international event prior to the Junior Worlds. 

The term "Junior" in ISU competition refers to age, not skill level. Skaters may remain age-eligible for Junior Worlds even after competing nationally and internationally at the senior level. At junior events, the ISU requires that all programs conform to junior-specific rules regarding program length, jumping passes, types of elements, etc.

Minimum TES

Number of entries per discipline 
Based on the results of the 2015 World Junior Championships, the ISU allowed each country one to three entries per discipline.

Entries 
Some national associations began announcing their selections in December 2015. The ISU published a complete list on 25 February 2016.

Changes to initial assignments

Results

Men
Israel's Daniel Samohin climbed from 9th after the short program to win his country's first World Junior title in figure skating. Nicolas Nadeau, who missed the cut for the free skate in 2015, obtained the silver medal and three spots for Canada in the 2017 men's event. Called up to replace the injured Nathan Chen, Tomoki Hiwatashi was awarded the bronze medal in his first appearance at Junior Worlds.

Ladies
Youth Olympic and JGP Final champion Polina Tsurskaya withdrew before the short program due to an ankle injury. Short program leader Alisa Fedichkina withdrew before the start of the free skate, also due to an ankle injury.

Japan's Marin Honda ended Russia's five-year streak of World Junior ladies' titles. Despite her teammates' withdrawals, Maria Sotskova was able to retain three spots for Russia by placing in the top two. Wakaba Higuchi of Japan won her second consecutive bronze medal at Junior Worlds.

Pairs
Anna Dušková / Martin Bidař became the first Czech figure skaters to ever win gold at a World Junior Championships and the first pair skaters from outside China, Russia, or the United States to win the competition since 2000. Russian pairs Anastasia Mishina / Vladislav Mirzoev and Ekaterina Borisova / Dmitry Sopot took silver and bronze, respectively, in their first trip to Junior Worlds.

Ice dancing
The United States won both the gold and silver medals. Lorraine McNamara / Quinn Carpenter overtook short program leaders Rachel Parsons / Michael Parsons for the title, finishing ahead by a margin of 0.91. It was the fourth appearance at Junior Worlds for both teams. Russia's Alla Loboda / Pavel Drozd rose from sixth after the short dance to take bronze in their first trip to the event.

Medals summary

Medalists
Medals for overall placement:

Small medals for placement in the short segment:

Small medals for placement in the free segment:

By country
Table of medals for overall placement:

Table of small medals for placement in the short segment:

Table of small medals for placement in the free segment:

References

External links
 
 2016 World Junior Championships at the International Skating Union
 Detailed results at the International Skating Union

World Junior Figure Skating Championships
World Junior 2016
World Junior Figure Skating Championships
World Junior Figure Skating Championships
Sport in Debrecen